The following is a list of active military aircraft of the Philippines.

Air  Force

Army Aviation Regiment

Naval Air Wing

Coast Guard Aviation Force

See also 
 List of equipment of the Philippine Air Force

References

External links 
 Armed Forces of the Philippines Official Website
 Philippine Air Force Official Website

Military equipment of the Philippines
Philippine Air Force
Philippines
Philippines military-related lists